John Walsh may refer to the following people:

Politicians
Sir John Walsh, 1st Baronet (1759–1825), English landowner and MP
John Walsh, 1st Baron Ormathwaite (1798–1881), British politician
John Walsh (Australian politician) (1842–1893), Member of the Queensland Legislative Assembly
John Walsh (Canadian politician), president of the Conservative Party of Canada
John Walsh (Dakota politician), member of the Legislature of Dakota Territory
John Walsh (Montana politician) (born 1960), U.S. Senator from Montana
John Carroll Walsh (1816–1894), American politician from Maryland
John E. Walsh (born 1958), former Chairman of the Massachusetts Democratic Party
John Edward Walsh (1816–1869), Irish lawyer and Conservative politician
John J. Walsh (born 1962), member of the Michigan House of Representatives
John Jackson Walsh (1871–1949), American politician from Massachusetts
John M. Walsh (born 1940), American politician from Iowa
John Walsh (Irish politician) (1856–1925), Irish businessman and nationalist politician
John R. Walsh (1913–1975), U.S. Representative from Indiana
John T. Walsh (politician) (1898–1977), American politician from Pennsylvania
Jack Walsh (politician), American politician from Delaware

Sportsmen
John Walsh (American football) (born 1972), Brigham Young University starting quarterback
John Walsh (baseball) (1879–1947), Major League player
John Walsh (rugby league), rugby league footballer of the 1970s for Great Britain, England, and St Helens RLFC
Johnny Walsh (footballer, born 1957), Irish former soccer player
Johnny Walsh (Gaelic footballer) (1909–1998), Irish Gaelic footballer
Johnny Walsh (hurler) (1874–1957), Irish athlete aka Seán Breathnach
Jack Walsh (Australian footballer) (1892–1915), Australian rules footballer for South Melbourne
Jack Walsh (cricketer) (1912–1980), Australian cricketer
Jack Walsh (English footballer) (1901–1965), English footballer
Jack Walsh (Gaelic footballer) (1903–?), Gaelic footballer for Kerry
Jack Walsh (rugby league), Australian rugby league player
Jack Walsh (rugby union) (born 2000), Australian rugby union player

Religion
John Walsh (bishop) (1830–1898), Roman Catholic Archbishop of Toronto
John Baptist Walsh (c. 1750–1825), Irish cleric and administrator
John T. Walsh (Adventist) (1816–1886), co-founder of a group which merged into the Advent Christian Church
John Walsh (priest), Irish Anglican priest

Other people
John Walsh (American scientist), associate professor of physiology
John Walsh (art historian) (born 1937), Director of the J. Paul Getty Museum, 1983–2000
John Walsh (artist) (born 1954), New Zealand painter
John Walsh (filmmaker), British director
John Walsh (Medal of Honor) (1841–1924), Irish-born Union Army soldier during the American Civil War
John Walsh (printer) (1665/66–1736), and his son John Walsh (1709–1766), music publishers
John Walsh (scientist) (1726–1795), British scientist and Secretary to the Governor of Bengal
John Walsh (television host) (born 1945), host of America's Most Wanted
Johnny Walsh (gang member) (1852–1883), New York City gangster
John A. Walsh, American sports journalist, executive editor of ESPN
John C. Walsh, American writer and director
John Evangelist Walsh (1927–2015), American writer and historian
John F. Walsh (born 1961), United States Attorney for the District of Colorado, 2010–2016
John G. Walsh (born 1950), American economist and acting Comptroller of the Currency
John Henry Walsh (1810–1888), English writer on sport under the pseudonym of "Stonehenge"
John P. Walsh (sociologist), professor of public policy at Georgia Institute of Technology
John Prendergast Walsh (1798–1867), Irish-born soldier who served in the Battle of Waterloo
John W. Walsh (1949–2017), American non-profit leader and patient advocate
John Christopher Walsh, appellant in the Christy Walsh case in Northern Ireland

See also
Jonathan Walsh (born 1989), Swedish former professional StarCraft 2 player
John Walshe (disambiguation)
John Welsh (disambiguation)